C/1881 K1 (also called the Great Comet of 1881, Comet Tebbutt, 1881 III, 1881b) is a long-period comet discovered by Australian amateur astronomer John Tebbutt on 22 May 1881 at Windsor, New South Wales. It is called a great comet because of its brightness at its last apparition.

Observations
On June 1 Tebbutt found the length of the tail to be 8° 38′. The comet was observed in the southern hemisphere from its discovery to June 11; it then became visible in the night sky of the northern hemisphere by June 22 as a spectacular object to the naked eye. On June 25 the tail's length was about 25° and the brightness of the nucleus was magnitude 1. The comet was still visible to the naked eye in August but by the end of the month the tail was not discernible. In the Alps at an altitude between 1000 and 2000 meters, Camille Flammarion observed the comet until the beginning of September. The last successful telescope observation of the comet was on 15 February 1882.

For Tebbutt's Comet of 1881, Henry Draper took the first wide-angle photograph of a comet's tail and the first spectrum of a comet's head. Andrew Common used his Newtonian reflecting telescope with 36-inch mirror to photograph the comet.

Tebbutt’s account

In his Astronomical Memoirs in the section entitled 1881, John Tebbutt gave an account of his discovery:

References

External links
 
 The great comet of 1881. Observed on the night of June 25–26 at 1 h. 30m.
 
 THE BRIGHT-COMET CHRONICLES by John E. Bortle, 1998
 

Non-periodic comets
18810522
Great comets